Rumaniamania is the debut studio album by Japanese J-Pop band Rumania Montevideo. It was released on June 16, 1999, by Giza Studio label.

Background
The album consist only of their debut single: Still for your love. The beginning of single recording started near end of year 1998 during their formation period and made it into television on-air in January 1999. It became their smash-hit which sold more than 165,000 copies and charted on Oricon rankings for 13 weeks. B-side song Good-Bye Summer Vacation was included in this album as well.

Lifevideo is the second and final original song performed and written by leader of the band, Makoto.

Sayonara was re-recorded from the original song Jonathan which was performed in English and included in their first indies album Jet Plane.

Anny was performed in acoustic live performance "UNDOWN vol.4".

Charting
The album reached #9 rank in Oricon for first week. It charted for 6 weeks and sold 92,360 copies.

Track listing

Personnel
Credits adapted from the CD booklet of Rumania Mania.

Mami Miyoshi – vocals, songwriting, drums
Makoto Miyoshi - producer, vocals, guitar, arranging, composing, songwriting,
Satomi Makoshi - bass, backing vocals
Akiko Matsuda - keyboards, backing vocals, saxophone
Kazunobu Mashima - guitar
Hirohito Furui (Garnet Crow) - arranging
Yoshinori Akai - recording, mixing
Secil Minami - backing vocals
Takumi Ito - backing vocals
Toshiyuki Ebihara (cule) - A&R 
Daisuke Suzuki (cule) - A&R
Hideaki Magarite - artist management 
Gan Kojima – art direction
Rockaku - producing

In media

Still for your love: ending theme song for the Anime television series Detective Conan

References 

1999 debut albums
Being Inc. albums
Giza Studio albums
Japanese-language albums
Rumania Montevideo albums
Albums produced by Daiko Nagato